Dude is an American slang term for an individual, usually male.

Dude or Dudes may also refer to:

People
 Dan the Dude (fl. c. 1905–1915), New York City criminal and cafe owner
 Devin the Dude (born 1970), American musician
 Gustavo Dudamel (born 1981), Venezuelan musician nicknamed "The Dude"
 Dude Esterbrook (1857–1901), American Major League Baseball player
 Dude Harlino (born 1980), Indonesian actor
 Dude Mowrey (born 1972), American country music singer
 Dude Love (born 1965), a ring name for former American professional wrestler Mick Foley

Fictional characters
 "The Dude", in the Western film Rio Bravo, played by Dean Martin
 Dave "the Dude", hero of the film Lady for a Day (1933) and its remake, Pocketful of Miracles (1961)
 Jeffrey "The Dude" Lebowski, protagonist of the film The Big Lebowski (1998)
 Dude Lester, in the 1932 novel Tobacco Road and the 1941 film adaptation
 Dr. Dude, from the pinball machine Dr. Dude And His Excellent Ray (1990)
 Dude, a character in the 2021 film Free Guy

Music
 The Dudes, a Canadian band
 Th' Dudes, a New Zealand band
 Dude (musical), a 1972 musical
 The Dude (Quincy Jones album), a 1981 record album
 The Dude (Devin the Dude album), a 1998 record album
 Dudes (album), a 2011 album by David Mead
 "Dude (Looks Like a Lady)", a 1987 song by Aerosmith
 "Dude" (Beenie Man song), 2004
 "Dude" (Lethal Bizzle and Stormzy song), 2015
 WYAY (FM), a radio station licensed to Bolivia, North Carolina, United States and formerly called The Dude

Other uses
 Dodge D Series, a 1970s line of pickup trucks known as The Dude
 Dude River, Romania
 Dude (film), a 2018 American film
 Dudes (film), a 1987 punk rock Western film
 The Dude (magazine), a men's magazine of the 1950s
 "The Dude", former branding of North Carolina radio station WYAY (FM)
 Discrete Universal Denoiser (DUDE), a denoising scheme in information theory and signal processing
 Baxter Street Dudes, an 1870s New York City teenage street gang

See also
 Chester A. Arthur (1829-1886), President of the United States nicknamed the "Dude President" 

Lists of people by nickname